Eugène Manchiska is a former male French international table tennis player.

He won a silver medal at the 1948 World Table Tennis Championships in the Swaythling Cup with Guy Amouretti, Maurice Bordrez, Charles Dubouillé and Michel Haguenauer.

See also
 List of table tennis players
 List of World Table Tennis Championships medalists

References

French male table tennis players
World Table Tennis Championships medalists